Ljubojno (Macedonian Cyrillic: Љубојно) is a village located in the region of Prespa in North Macedonia. Ljubojno is situated some 2 km from Prespa lake and about 5 km north of the Greek border, and its elevation is about 920 m above sea level. The population of Ljubojno is 186.

Demographics
Ljubojno is inhabited by Orthodox Macedonians. In the late Ottoman period, some Bektashi Albanians, known locally as Kolonjarë, used to also reside in the village of Ljubojno.

As of the 2021 census, Ljubojno had 141 residents with the following ethnic composition:
Macedonians 131
Persons for whom data are taken from administrative sources 7
Others 3

According to the 2002 census, the village had a total of 186 inhabitants. Ethnic groups in the village include:
Macedonians 175
Albanians 10
Vlachs 1

Religious objects
There are 8 Orthodox churches in the village. Among them are Sv. Prechista, St. Atanasij, St. Marena, St. Elijah, St. Dimitrija, St. Bogorodica and monastery  of St. Petre and Paul. Church of St. John was built in 1861, was destroyed by fire in 1903 and was renovated in 1921.

People from Ljubojno 
Lambe Alabakoski (1987 -), singer
Josif Grezlovski - Gandeto (1945-), writer
Naum Manilov - Prespanski (1934 - 1961), poet
Vlado Tudžarovski, politician

References

External links
 Article about Ljubojno on MakLink

Villages in Resen Municipality